The One Thing That Still Holds True is a compilation album released in 1995 by American hardcore punk band Chain of Strength on Revelation Records. The album consists of the band's entire recorded history.

Track list

Notes:
Track 1 was previously unreleased.
Tracks 2–5 previously released as "What Holds Us Apart" on Foundation Records 1990.
Recorded at Pendragon Studios, May 89 - Feb 90.
Tracks 6–11 previously released as "True Till Death" on Revelation Records 1989. 
Recorded at Spot, 1989.

Personnel
Bass – Alex Barreto
Drums – Chris Bratton
Engineer – Bill Krondell* (tracks: 2 to 5)
Guitar – Ryan Hoffman
Guitar (Crunch) – Frosty
Producer – Chain Of Strength
Vocals – Curt Canales

References

1995 compilation albums
Revelation Records compilation albums
Hardcore punk albums by American artists